T. R. Pattinam taluk (Thirumalairayanpattinam taluk) is a taluk in Karaikal district, Puducherry union territory, India. It contains 5 villages and 10 sub villages or hamlets.

Villages in T.R. Pattinam taluk
 Thirumalairajanpattinam
 Polagam, Karaikal
 Keezhaiyur (North)
 Keezhaiyur (South)
 Vanjore

Sub villages in T.R.Pattinam taluk
 Thirumalairajanpattinam
 Keezhavanjore
 Melavanjore
 Keezhavanjore Kuppam
 Keezhaiyur (North)
 Keezhaiyur (South)
 Polagam, Karaikal
 Nayaneekattalai
 Melayurpet
 Padutharkollai

References

Taluks of Karaikal district